Buckeye Township is a township in Dickinson County, Kansas, USA.  As of the 2000 census, its population was 437.

Buckeye Township was organized in 1873.

Geography
According to the USGS, it contains one cemetery, Union.

Further reading

References

 USGS Geographic Names Information System (GNIS)

External links
 Dickinson County - Official Website
 City-Data.com
 Dickinson County Maps: Current, Historic, KDOT

Townships in Dickinson County, Kansas
Townships in Kansas